The Wild Women of Wongo is a 1958 American adventure film directed by James L. Wolcott and starring Jean Hawkshaw, Mary Ann Webb, Cande Gerrard, and Adrienne Bourbeau. It features low budget, stereotypical portrayals of fictional tropical islanders.

Plot summary 
The film starts with narration from Mother Nature, discussing an experiment with Father Time that went wrong. On the (fictional) island of Wongo she created a tribe where the men are brutish and ugly and the women are beautiful. She then creates a tribe on a nearby island called Goona where the women are repulsive and the men are strong and handsome. For years the two tribes lived unaware of each other's existence, until ape men from across the ocean attack the village of Goona.

The tribe sends their king's son to seek help against the invaders. The son finds the island of Wongo, the day before the village men pick their brides. The women, seeing the handsome prince, begin questioning their life among the brutes that dwell in the village. The men grow jealous of their visitor and plot to kill him. The women of Wongo, finding out about this, risk their lives to protect the prince, and in doing so offend the crocodile god of the Wongo people (portrayed by stock footage of a crocodilian and a rubber model). The women are rounded up by the village men and are sent out into the wilderness until the reptile god has drawn blood for the insult. The women band together, watching each other's backs until the ape men arrive at their village and, after they dispatch the invaders to the god, leave in search for the men that had abandoned the island of Wongo. In Goona, the men have just begun their rite of manhood, in which they go into the jungle, without weapons, for a month. The women of Wongo, coming upon the weaponless men, decide to take advantage of their helplessness and, one by one, claim them in marriage. The film concludes with all the beautiful men and women married, and the ugly men with the ugly women.

Cast 
Jean Hawkshaw as Omoo
Mary Ann Webb as Mona
Cande Gerrard as Ahtee
Adrienne Bourbeau (not to be confused with Adrienne Barbeau) as Wana
Marie Goodhart, Michelle Lamarck, Joyce Nizzari, Val Phillips and Jo Elaine Wagner as Woman of Wongo
Pat Crowley, Ray Rotello, Billy Day, Burt Parker, Robert Serrecchia and Whitey Hart as Man of Wongo
Barbara Lee Babbitt, Bernadette, Elaine Krasher, Lillian Melek, Iris Rautenberg and Roberta Wagner as Woman of Goona
Johnny Walsh as Engor
Ed Fury as Gahbo
Roy Murray, Steve Klisanin, Walter Knoch, Ronald Mankowski, Gerry Roslund, Varden Spencer and Kenneth Vitulli as Man of Goona
Rex Richards as King of Wongo
Burt Williams as King of Goona
Zuni Dyer as Priestess
Olga Suarez as Spirit of the Priestess

Production 
Some of the stock music in the film was also used in Plan 9 from Outer Space.
The film was shot at the Coral Castle built by Edward Leedskalnin in Homestead, Florida.

In other media
The film was featured in an episode of Ed the Sock's This Movie Sucks!

The film was featured in the film Screwballs although the Te-Pee theatre sign is misspelled as The Wild Women Of Wango.

In the Video Game "Amazon: Guardians of Eden" "Wild Women of Wongo" is one of the main character's favorite films.

The Wild Women of Wongo was riffed by Mystery Science Theater 3000 successor project The Film Crew in 2007.

The theatrical rock band The Tubes had a song by the same name on their 1983 record Outside Inside. It is a parody of the film.

References

External links 

 Don't open that door! #50, film review at PopMatters

1958 films
1958 adventure films
1950s fantasy comedy films
Films set in prehistory
Films set on fictional islands
Films shot in Florida
1958 comedy films
1950s English-language films
American adventure comedy films
1950s American films